= Tricomia (Bithynia) =

Town in ancient Bithynia

Coordinates: 40°57′39″N 30°01′58″E

Trikomia was an inland town of ancient Bithynia inhabited during Roman times.

Its site is tentatively located near Tekeli in Asiatic Turkey.
